The Derbyshire Record Society is a text publication society for the county of Derbyshire in England. It was established in 1977.

Selected publications
 The Bailiffs of Derby: Urban Governors and their Governance 1513-1638
 The Building of Hardwick Hall. Part 2: The New Hall, 1591-98
 A Catalogue of Local Maps of Derbyshire c.1528-1800
 A Catalogue of the Library of Titus Wheatcroft of Ashover
 Chesterfield Parish Register 1558-1600
 Chesterfield Parish Register 1601-1635
 The Churchwardens Audit and Vestry Order Book of All Saints, Derby, 1465-1689
 A Derbyshire Armory
 The Derbyshire Church Notes of Sir Stephen Glynne 1825-1873
 Derbyshire Directories 1781-1824
 Derbyshire Feet of Fines 1323-1546
 The Derbyshire Gentry in the Fifteenth Century
 The Derbyshire Papist Returns of 1705-6
 Derbyshire Pedigrees An Index to the holdings of Derby Local Studies Library
 The Derbyshire Returns to the 1851 Religious Census
 Derbyshire Tithe Files 1836-50
 Derbyshire Wills proved in the Prerogative Court of Canterbury 1393-1574
 Derbyshire Wills proved in the Prerogative Court of Canterbury 1575-1601
 The Diary of Joseph Jenkinson of Dronfield, 1833-43
 An Early Muniment Register from Hardwick Hall
 Essays in Derbyshire History presented to Gladwyn Turbutt
 George Sitwell's Letterbook 1662-66
 A Glossary of Household, Farming and Trade Terms from Probate Inventories

See also
 Derbyshire Record Office

References 

1977 establishments in England
History of Derbyshire
Text publication societies
Organisations based in Derbyshire